Buffalo Township is a township in Winnebago County, Iowa, in the USA.

History
Buffalo Township was established in 1888.

References

Townships in Winnebago County, Iowa
Townships in Iowa
1888 establishments in Iowa